Lieutenant Rose was a British short film series directed by Percy Stow and produced by the Clarendon Film Company.

Films 

 Lieutenant Rose and the Robbers of Fingall's Creek (1910)
 Lieutenant Rose and the Foreign Spy (1910)
 Lieutenant Rose and the Gunrunners (1910)
 Lieutenant Rose and the Stolen Submarine (1910)
 Lieutenant Rose and the Chinese Pirates (1910)
 Lieutenant Rose and the Stolen Code (1911)
 Lieutenant Rose and the Boxers (1911)
 Lieutenant Rose and the Royal Visit (1911)
 Lieutenant Rose and the Stolen Ship (1912)
 Lieutenant Rose and the Moorish Raiders (1912)
 Lieutenant Rose and the Hidden Treasure (1912)
 Lieutenant Rose and the Train Wreckers (1912)
 Lieutenant Rose and the Patent Aeroplane (1912)
 Lieutenant Rose in the China Seas (1913)
 Lieutenant Rose and the Stolen Bullion (1913)
 Lieutenant Rose and the Sealed Orders (1914)
 How Lieutenant Rose RN Spiked the Enemy's Guns (1915)

References 

British film series
Films directed by Percy Stow